Kobielice  is a village in the administrative district of Gmina Suszec, within Pszczyna County, Silesian Voivodeship, in southern Poland.

The village has a population of 1,100.

References

Kobielice